"Fingers" is a song by English singer and songwriter Zayn Malik, released on 18 October 2018 by RCA Records. It serves as the fifth single from his second studio album Icarus Falls (2018).

Promotion
Malik later encouraged fans to upload themselves dancing to the song and to tag it "#FingersDance", as a "challenge" that they could potentially win a gift from.

Critical reception
David Renshaw of The Fader called "Fingers" a "slow jam" with lyrics about texting, with Zayn singing "'my fingers ain't working but my heart is' over a pitched up vocal sample". Jon Blistein of Rolling Stone said the song "boasts an alluring mid-tempo beat with low synths bubbling around a crisp drum groove", explaining that Zayn "keeps his vocals low, yet seductive as he tries to come to grips with an unrequited love while staring at his phone". Gil Kaufman of Billboard called it a "hazy R&B ballad" that concerns "a love that is so paralyzing that it makes your digits freeze up mid-text".

Charts

Certifications

References

2018 songs
2018 singles
2010s ballads
Zayn Malik songs
Songs written by Zayn Malik
Contemporary R&B ballads